Treasure Island is a 1981 arcade video game from Data East. It was released for the DECO Cassette System as well as a standalone cabinet. Treasure Island is a vertically scrolling game with isometric graphics. The goal is to climb a sinking island while gathering treasure.

A port for the TI-99/4A was published in 1984.

Gameplay

See also
Zaxxon (December 1981)
Congo Bongo (1983)

References

External links
 Treasure Island gameplay video

1981 video games
Arcade video games
Data East arcade games
Data East video games
Maze games
Multiplayer and single-player video games
Multiplayer hotseat games
Texas Instruments games
TI-99/4A games
Video games developed in Japan
Video games with isometric graphics